The President of the Associação Brasileira de Estatística is the highest officer of the Associação Brasileira de Estatística (ABE).

List of presidents

20th Century
 1984-1986 Djalma Galvão Carneiro Pessoa
 1986-1988 Wilton de Oliveira Bussab
 1988-1990 Carlos Alberto B. Pereira
 1990-1992 Ruben Klein
 1992-1994 Clóvis de A. Peres
 1994-1996 Pedro Alberto Morettin
 1996-1998 Heleno Bolfarine
 1998-2000 Hélio S. Migon

21st Century
 2000-2002 Gauss Moutinho Cordeiro
 2002-2004 Clélia M. C. Toloi
 2004-2006 Lúcia Pereira Barroso
 2006-2008 Wilton de Oliveira Bussab
 2008-2010 Silvia R. C. Loopes
 2010-2012 Luiz Koodi Hotta

See also
President of the American Statistical Association
President of the Institute of Mathematical Statistics
President of the Royal Statistical Society
President of the Statistical Society of Canada

External links
Photo gallery of the presidents

Lists of presidents of organizations
Presidents of statistical organizations
Presidents